The 2020 Hungarian Open was the second event of the 2020 ITTF World Tour. It took place from 18–23 February in Budapest, Hungary.

Men's singles

Seeds 

 Tomokazu Harimoto (champion)
 Hugo Calderano (quarterfinals)
 Dimitrij Ovtcharov (semifinals)
 Patrick Franziska (first round)
 Koki Niwa (first round)
 Jun Mizutani (first round)
 Wong Chun Ting (first round)
 Simon Gauzy (first round)
 Liam Pitchford (semifinals)
 Vladimir Samsonov (first round)
 Kristian Karlsson (quarterfinals)
 Kanak Jha (first round)
 Jonathan Groth (first round)
 Sathiyan Gnanasekaran (second round)
 Daniel Habesohn (first round)
 Bence Majoros (first round)

Top half

Bottom half

Finals

Women's singles

Seeds 

 Mima Ito (champion)
 Kasumi Ishikawa (semifinals)
 Cheng I-ching (final)
 Miu Hirano (quarterfinals)
 Doo Hoi Kem (quarterfinals)
 Hitomi Sato (quarterfinals)
 Bernadette Szőcs (first round)
 Petrissa Solja (first round)
 Adriana Díaz (second round)
 Miyu Kato (second round)
 Chen Szu-yu (first round)
 Lily Zhang (first round)
 Minnie Soo Wai Yam (second round)
 Han Ying (semifinals)
 Elizabeta Samara (first round)
 Dóra Madarász (first round)

Top half

Bottom half

Finals

Men's doubles

Seeds 

 Ho Kwan Kit / Wong Chun Ting (semifinals)
 Benedikt Duda / Patrick Franziska (champions)
 Chen Chien-an / Chuang Chih-yuan (quarterfinals)
 Nandor Ecseki / Adam Szudi (quarterfinals)
 Martin Allegro / Florent Lambiet (first round)
 Jakub Dyjas /  Cedric Nuytinck (semifinals)
 Shunsuke Togami / Yukiya Uda (first round)
 Lam Siu Hang / Ng Pak Nam (quarterfinals)

Draw

Women's doubles

Seeds 

 Chen Szu-yu / Cheng Hsien-tzu (quarterfinals)
 Doo Hoi Kem / Lee Ho Ching (final)
 Barbora Balážová /  Hana Matelová (first round)
 Miu Hirano / Kasumi Ishikawa (champions)
 Dóra Madarász / Szandra Pergel (first round)
 Orawan Paranang / Suthasini Sawettabut (semifinals)
 Adriana Díaz / Melanie Díaz (first round)
 Minnie Soo Wai Yam / Zhu Chengzhu (semifinals)

Draw

Mixed doubles

Seeds 

 Wong Chun Ting / Doo Hoi Kem (champions)
 Jun Mizutani / Mima Ito (quarterfinals)
 Ľubomír Pištej / Barbora Balážová (first round)
 Ho Kwan Kit / Lee Ho Ching (quarterfinals)
 Adam Szudi / Szandra Pergel (first round)
 Tristan Flore / Laura Gasnier (first round)
 Patrick Franziska / Petrissa Solja (final)
 Ovidiu Ionescu / Bernadette Szőcs (quarterfinals)

Draw

References 

Hungarian Open (table tennis)
Hungarian Open
Open
Table tennis competitions in Hungary
International sports competitions in Budapest
Hungarian Open
2020s in Budapest